This is a list of Swedish sail frigates of the period 1640 to 1860
 Fenix 30
 Danska Fenix 30/32 (ex-Danish Phenix/Foniks, captured 1659)
 Hjort 32
 Sundsvall 32
 Nordstjerna 22
 Utter 30
 Fredrika Amalia 34
 Stenbock 32
 Elfsborg 42
 Reval 40
 Charlotte 38 - Captured by Denmark 1719
 Stralsund 30
 Anklam 30
 St Thomas 30
 St Johannes 30
 Hvita Örn 30 - Captured by Denmark 1715, renamed Hvide Ørn
 Falk 26 - Captured by Denmark 1715
 Välkomsten 24
 Thais 24
 Kiskin 22 - Captured by Russia 1720
 Grip 14
 (3 frigates) - Scuttled 1715
 Wolgast 26
 Ruskenfeldt 24
 ? class
 ?
 Illerim 36 - Captured by the United Kingdom 1716, given to Denmark and renamed Pommern
 ?
 ?
 Island/Islandsfahrere 30 - Captured by Denmark 1717
 Stora Phoenix 24 - Captured by Russia 1720, renamed Fenix (same as Phoenix above?)
 Lilla Phoenix
 Danska Örn 18 - Captured by Russia 1720
 Packa
 Svarta Örn 36
 Jarramas 30
 Vainqueur 30
 Delphin
 Louisiana
 Illerim

Lists of frigates
frigates
frigates